William Thomas 'Will Tom' Carpenter (November 16, 1854 in Johnson County, Missouri – March 30, 1933), the youngest son of James and Cynthia (Johnson) Carpenter, was a legendary cowman who authored a book about his experiences.

Ancestry
He was descended from a noteworthy Swiss-American family whose surname was Zimmermann, anglicized to Carpenter in  anglophone North America.  The emigrant ancestor, Will Tom's great-great-grandfather, George Carpenter, enlisted in the First Virginia Regiment at the outbreak of the American Revolution and died in service of wounds received in the Battle of Brandywine.  His great-grandfather Adam Carpenter was one of three brothers who established Carpenter's Station, Kentucky in 1780.

Earlier life
When he was an infant, his family, who were Southern sympathizers, moved to Bourbon County, Kansas, then migrated in a wagon train up the Platte River to settle near Pike's Peak, El Paso County, Colorado.  From 1862 to 1900, as cowhand and later as trail boss, he traveled all the famed cattle trails of Texas, Oklahoma, New Mexico, Kansas, Colorado, Montana, Nevada, Utah, and Arizona.

Later life
He married late in 1875 or early in 1876 in Missouri to Mattie Christenson, who was born August 28, 1859 at Copenhagen, Denmark; she was 16 years old.  After his retirement from "cowboying," they settled on their ranch west of the Pecos in Terrell County, Texas.  He died on March 30, 1933 in the Kerr Hotel in Sanderson, Texas, where he had gone for medical treatment.

Mattie (Christensen) Carpenter survived her husband by three years and inherited his estate.  She left no will and no relative could be found after her death on September 1, 1936, so the state of Texas became her heir.

References

1854 births
1933 deaths
People from Johnson County, Missouri
People from Terrell County, Texas
20th-century American writers